Takiri Miyazaki (born 23 August 1978) is a Japanese diver. She competed in the women's 10 metre platform event at the 2004 Summer Olympics.

References

1978 births
Living people
Japanese female divers
Olympic divers of Japan
Divers at the 2004 Summer Olympics
Place of birth missing (living people)
Asian Games medalists in diving
Divers at the 2002 Asian Games
Asian Games bronze medalists for Japan
Medalists at the 2002 Asian Games
20th-century Japanese women